Nína Björk Árnadóttir (7 June 1941 – 16 April 2000) was an Icelandic playwright, poet, and novelist.

Life
She graduated from Reykjavík Theatre Company Actors Training School in 1965.
She studied at University of Copenhagen.
In 1989, she was Reykjavík City poet.

Works
Ævintyrabokin um Alfreð Floka, Forlagið, 1992, 
Engill i snjonum, Iðunn, 1994, 
Þriðja astin, Iðunn, 1995, 
Alla leið hingað, Iðunn, 1996,

References

External links

Icelandic women poets
Árnadóttir, Nína Björk
Árnadóttir, Nína Björk
Árnadóttir, Nína Björk
People from Reykjavík
20th-century Icelandic poets
Icelandic women writers
Árnadóttir, Nína Björk